Silvia Szalai (born 26 February 1975) is a retired German swimmer who won one silver and two gold medals in the 4 × 200 m freestyle relay at the European and world championships in 1998, 1999 and 2001. At the 2001 World Aquatics Championships her team finished in fourth place, but the leading Australian and US squads were disqualified.

She was born in Hungary and later moved to Frankfurt, hoping to compete for Germany at the 2000 Summer Olympics. However, the International Olympic Committee rejected her application on technical grounds.

References

1975 births
Living people
German female swimmers
German female freestyle swimmers
Hungarian female swimmers
Sportspeople from Szeged
World Aquatics Championships medalists in swimming
European Aquatics Championships medalists in swimming